The Kanzelhoehe Solar Observatory or KSO is an astronomical observatory affiliated with the Institute of Geophysics, Astrophysics and Meteorology out of the University of Graz. It is located near Villach on the southern border of Austria.

Its Web page usually posts current images of the sun, especially in the hydrogen-alpha line that is the strongest visible-light line of hydrogen and that reveals the solar chromosphere.

History
Founded in 1941 by the German Luftwaffe to research the effects of the Sun on the Earth's ionosphere, the KSO focuses on multispectral synoptic observations of the sun using several telescope on the same mount.

See also
 List of astronomical observatories

References

External links
 www.kso.ac.at/

Astronomical observatories in Austria
Buildings and structures in Carinthia (state)
Space Situational Awareness Programme